Nemamyxine kreffti, the Krefft's hagfish, is a species of hagfish in the genus Nemamyxine. It is found in the Southwest Atlantic Ocean from off Argentina and southern Brazil.

Size

Etymology
The fish is named in honor of German ichthyologist-herpetologist Gerhard Krefft (1912‒1993), Institute für Seefischerei in Hamburg, on the occasion of his 70th birthday, for his many "valuable" contributions to oceanic ichthyology; Krefft also loaned the holotype specimens to the authors [not to be confused with his great uncle, German-born Australian adventurer and zoologist Johann Ludwig (Louis) Gerard Krefft (1830‒1881), for whom several fishes are named].

References

Myxinidae
Taxa named by Charmion B. McMillan
Taxa named by Robert Lester Wisner
Fish described in 1982
Fish of the Atlantic Ocean